Shah Mohammad (1780–1862), was a Punjabi poet who lived during the reign of Maharaja Ranjit Singh (1780 – 1839) and is best known for his book Jangnama (Book of War) written around 1846, which depicts  the First Anglo-Sikh War (1845 – 1846) that took place after the death of Maharaja Ranjit Singh in 1839.

It is widely believed by historians that Shah Mohammad had gathered his book material from many eye-witness accounts of his relatives employed in Maharaja Ranjit Singh's army. That's how he could piece together a complete picture of the battle between the Punjabis and the British. Therefore, Shah Mohammad's book is considered the most accurate book on the reasons for the fall of Sikh rule in the Punjab.

References

External links
 Singh, Khushwant, "A history of the Sikhs Volume II"

Punjabi-language poets
1780 births
1862 deaths
18th-century Indian Muslims
18th-century Indian historians
18th-century Indian non-fiction writers
18th-century Indian poets
19th-century Indian Muslims
19th-century Indian historians
19th-century Indian non-fiction writers
19th-century Indian poets